Violet is a female given name which comes from the eponymous flower. As with other such names, its popularity has varied dramatically over time. Flower names were commonly used from about 1880 through about 1910 in the United States, with usage dropping throughout the next 80 years or so; Violet was the 88th most frequent girls' given name in 1900, dropping below position 1000 by 1960. In 1990, the name appeared again in the top 1000 at position 289 and subsequently increased in popularity; it was the 69th most popular girls' name in 2013.

The cognates in other languages are Viola, Violeta, Violetta, or  Violette. These are common girls' given names, whose popularity varies by time and country.

Name variants

Violet – English
Violette – French, English
Violetta – Italian, Belgian, Dutch
Viola – Latin, English, Italian, German, Swedish
Violeta – Spanish, Greek, Portuguese, Romanian, Lithuanian, Albanian
Виолета / Violeta – Serbian
Виолета (Violeta) – Bulgarian
Виолетта (Violetta) – Russian
Βιολέττα (Violetta) or Βιολέτα (Violeta) – Greek
Wioleta, Wiola, Wioletta or Violetta – Polish

People
 Violet Aitken (1886–1987), British suffragette who was force-fed
Violet Alva (1908–1969), Indian lawyer, politician and deputy chair of the Rajya Sabha, and Indian National Congress member
 Violet Archer (1913–2000), Canadian composer, teacher, pianist, organist, and percussionist
 Violet Astor (1889–1965), English aristocrat
 Violet Attlee (1895–1964), English wife of British Prime Minister Clement Attlee
 Violet Barclay (1922–2010), American illustrator
 Violet Barungi (born 1943), Ugandan writer and editor
 Violet Benson (born 1988), Russian-born American Internet personality
 Violet Berlin (born 1968), British television presenter, producer and scriptwriter 
 Violet Bidwill Wolfner (1900–1962), owner of the Chicago / St. Louis Cardinals of the National Football League (NFL)
 Violet Blue (author), American writer and sex educator
 Violet Brown (1900–2017), Jamaican supercentenarian
 Violet Brunton (1878–1951), English artist
 Violet Bonham Carter (1887–1969), British politician and diarist
 Violet Cameron (1862–1919), English actress and singer
 Violet Carson (1898–1983), British actress of radio and television, and a singer and pianist
 Violet Chachki, American drag queen, burlesque dancer, recording artist, TV personality, and model
 Violet Cliff (1916–2003), British pair skater
 Violet Dandridge (1878–1956), American scientific illustrator, painter, naturalist, and suffragist
 Violet Dickson (1896–1991), wife of British colonial administrator H. R. P. Dickson
 Violet M. Digby (1900–1960), British artist
 Violet Douglas-Pennant (1869–1945), British philanthropist and supporter of local government
 Violet Duca, Turkish volleyball player and manager
 Violet Elton (died 1969), English badminton player
 Violet Englefield (1881–1946), British actress and singer
 Violet Fane, pen name of Lady Mary Montgomerie Currie (1843–1905), British poet, writer, and ambassadress
 Violet Farebrother (1888–1969), English film actress
 Violet Gibson (1876–1956), Irish aristocrat, attempted assassin of Benito Mussolini
 Violet Gillett (1898–1996), Canadian painter and educator
 Violet Gordon-Woodhouse (1872–1948), British musician
 Violet Graham (1890–1967), English stage and film actress
 Violet Hackbarth (1919–1988), American baseball player
 Violet Hamilton (1949–2014), photographer who lived and worked in Australia, the US, and the UK
 Violet Heming (1895–1981), English stage and screen actress
 Violet Henry-Anderson (1882–1935), Scottish-born golfer and partner of poet Elsa Gidlow
 Violet Herbert, Countess of Powis (1865–1929), British peer
 Violet Hopkins (born 1973), American painter
 Violet Hopson (1887–1973), British actress
 Violet Hunt (1862–1942), British writer
 Violet Rosemary Strachan Hutton (1925–2004), Scottish geophysicist and pioneer of magnetotellurics
 Violet Jacob (1863–1946), Scottish writer
 Violet Jessop (1887–1971), Argentine survivor of three shipwrecks
 Violet Annie Lee (1909–1982), mother of the Kray twins
 Violet Kajubiri, former General Secretary of the Wildlife Clubs of Uganda, and sister of Ugandan president Yoweri Museveni
 Violet Kazue de Cristoforo (1917–2007), Japanese American poet, composer, and translator of haiku
 Violet Kemble-Cooper (1886–1961), British stage and film actress
 Violet King Henry (1929–1982), Canadian lawyer
 Violet Knights (1894–1973), American silent film actress
 Violet La Plante (1908–1984), American silent film actress
 Violet Loraine (1886–1956), English actress and singer
 Violet MacMillan (1887–1953), American actress
 Violet Makuto (born 1993), Kenyan volleyball player
 Violet Manners, Duchess of Rutland (1856–1937), British artist and noblewoman
 Violet Markham (1872–1959), British writer and social reformer
 Violet May Cottrell (1887–1971), New Zealand writer, poet, and spiritualist
 Violet Melnotte (1855–1935), British stage performer, actress-manager, and theatre owner
 Violet Mersereau (1892–1975), American stage and film actress
 Violet Milner, Viscountess Milner (1872–1958), English Edwardian society lady, and editor of the political monthly, National Review
 Violet Milstead (1919–2014), Canadian aviator
 Violet Mond, Baroness Melchett (1867–1945), British humanitarian and activist
 Violet Mount, Australian soprano
 Violet Myers (1875–1943), classical singer and the wife of British diplomat William Algernon Churchill
 Violet Needham (1876–1967), English author
 Violet Neilson, Jamaican politician
 Violet Florence Martin (1862–1915), Irish writer
 Violet Oaklander (1927–2021), American child therapist and author
 Violet Oakley (1874–1961), American artist
 Violet Odogwu, Nigerian track and field athlete
 Violet Olney (1911–1999), English athlete
 Violet Owen (1902–1998), British tennis and hockey player
 Violet Palmer (born 1964), American basketball referee in the NBA and WNBA
 Violet Philpott (1922–2012), English puppeteer and author
 Violet Piercy (1889–1972), English long-distance runner
 Violet Pinckney (1871–1955), English tennis player
 Violet Plummer (1873–1962), South Australian medical doctor
 Violet Powell (1912–2002), British writer and critic
 Violet Richardson Ward (1888–1978), founder of the Berkeley Women's Gymnasium
 Violet Roche (1885–1967), New Zealand journalist and welfare worker
 Violet Romer (1886–1970), American dancer
 Violet Skies, Welsh singer-songwriter
 Violet Sleigh (born 1935), the first Miss Malaya
 Violet Smith, American female jockey
 Violet Teague (1872–1951), Australian artist
 Violet Tillard (1874–1922), suffragette, nurse, pacifist, conscientious objector supporter, famine relief worker, and Quaker
 Violet Trefusis (1894–1972), English writer and socialite
 Violet Tweedale (1862–1936), Scottish author, poet, and spiritualist
 Violet Van der Elst (1882–1966), British entrepreneur and campaigner best known for activities against the death penalty
 Violet Vanbrugh (1867–1942), English actress
 Violet Vimpany (1886–1979), Australian painter and etcher
 Violet Walrond (1905–1996), New Zealand swimmer
 Violet Wattenberg (born 1978), Netherlands international cricketer
 Violet Webb (1915–1999), English track and field athlete
 Violet Wegner (1887–1960), British singer
Violet Whiteman (1873–1952), English-born New Zealand artist
 Violet Wilkey (1903–1976), American child actress
 Violet Winspear (1928–1989), British writer
 Violet Wood (1899–2012), British supercentenarian
 Violet Yong Wui Wui (born 1977), Malaysian lawyer and politician

Fictional characters
 Violet, on the American sketch comedy TV series Don't Look Now
 Daisy, Lily, and Violet, Kanto Gym Leaders in Pokémon and Misty's sisters
 Violet, one of the Thea Sisters from China in Thea Stilton
 Violet (comics), a DC Comics character
 Violet, the title character from the musical
 Violet, one of the five main characters in the Winterborne Home series by Ally Carter
 Lee Chaolan or Violet, a Tekken 4 character
 Violet Crawley, Dowager Countess of Grantham, a character on Downton Abbey
 Violet Gamart, in Penelope Fitzgerald's The Bookshop (1978)
 Violet Gibson,  in the book series Spy School by Stuart Gibbs
 Violet Gray, a Peanuts character
 Violet Baudelaire, an A Series of Unfortunate Events character
 Violet Beauregarde, a Charlie and the Chocolate Factory character
 Violet Bridgerton, Dowager Lady Bridgerton, mother of the Bridgerton children in Julia Quinn's Bridgerton series
 Violet Evergarden, the protagonist of Kana Akatsuki's Violet Evergarden (2015)
 Violet Finn, from the American ABC soap opera, General Hospital
 Violet Harmon, an American Horror Story: Murder House character
 Violet Highway, an EastEnders character
 Violet Parr, a The Incredibles character
 Violet Sabrewing, a supporting character from DuckTales (2017)
 Violet Song jat Shariff, an UltraViolet character
 Violet Turner, a Private Practice character
 Violet née Walton, the sister of Hyacinth Bucket in "Keeping Up Appearances"
 Violet Weiler, from Fred Mustard Stewart's novel Ellis Island, also on the TV miniseries of the same name
 Violet Wilson, from the British ITV soap opera, Coronation Street

Equivalents from other cultures
The floral-inspired name is present in other cultures. Examples include:
Sumire (Japanese)
Calfuray (Mapuche)
Ibolya (Hungarian)
Viola (Italian; diminutive Violetta)
Violeta (Romanian)
Wiola (Polish; variants Wioleta, Wioletta)
Sigal (Hebrew)

References 

English feminine given names
Feminine given names
English given names
Given names derived from plants or flowers